The 1999–2000 OHL season was the 20th season of the Ontario Hockey League. The season was the first to award a point for an overtime loss. Twenty teams each played 68 games. The Barrie Colts won the J. Ross Robertson Cup, defeating the Plymouth Whalers.

Regular season

Final standings
Note: DIV = Division; GP = Games played; W = Wins; L = Losses; T = Ties; OTL = Overtime losses; GF = Goals for; GA = Goals against; PTS = Points; x = clinched playoff berth; y = clinched division title; z = clinched conference title

Eastern conference

Western conference

Scoring leaders
Note: GP = Games played; G = Goals; A = Assists; Pts = Points; PIM = Penalty minutes

Leading goaltenders
Note: GP = Games played; Mins = Minutes played; W = Wins; L = Losses: OTL = Overtime losses;  SL = Shootout losses; GA = Goals Allowed; SO = Shutouts; GAA = Goals against average

Playoffs

Conference quarterfinals

Eastern conference quarterfinals

(1) Barrie Colts vs. (8) North Bay Centennials

(2) Ottawa 67's vs. (7) Oshawa Generals

(3) Belleville Bulls vs. (6) Peterborough Petes

(4) Sudbury Wolves vs. (5) Kingston Frontenacs

Western conference quarterfinals

(1) Plymouth Whalers vs. (8) Guelph Storm

(2) Erie Otters vs. (7) Brampton Battalion

(3) Sault Ste. Marie Greyhounds vs. (6) Kitchener Rangers

(4) Sarnia Sting vs. (5) Windsor Spitfires

Conference semifinals

Eastern conference semifinals

(1) Barrie Colts vs. (4) Sudbury Wolves

(2) Ottawa 67's vs. (3) Belleville Bulls

Western conference semifinals

(1) Plymouth Whalers vs. (5) Windsor Spitfires

(2) Erie Otters vs. (3) Sault Ste. Marie Greyhounds

Conference finals

Eastern conference finals

(1) Barrie Colts vs. (3) Belleville Bulls

Western conference finals

(1) Plymouth Whalers vs. (3) Sault Ste. Marie Greyhounds

OHL finals

J. Ross Robertson cup finals

(W1) Plymouth Whalers vs. (E1) Barrie Colts

J. Ross Robertson Cup Champions Roster

Playoff scoring leaders
Note: GP = Games played; G = Goals; A = Assists; Pts = Points; PIM = Penalty minutes

Playoff leading goaltenders

Note: GP = Games played; Mins = Minutes played; W = Wins; L = Losses: OTL = Overtime losses; SL = Shootout losses; GA = Goals Allowed; SO = Shutouts; GAA = Goals against average

All-Star teams

First team
Dan Tessier, Centre, Ottawa 67's
Taylor Pyatt, Left Wing, Sudbury Wolves
Norm Milley, Right Wing, Sudbury Wolves
John Erskine, Defence, London Knights
Branislav Mezei, Defence, Belleville Bulls
Andrew Raycroft, Goaltender, Kingston Frontenacs
Peter DeBoer, Coach, Plymouth Whalers

Second team
Jason Jaspers, Centre, Sudbury Wolves
Raffi Torres, Left Wing, Brampton Battalion
Sheldon Keefe, Right Wing, Barrie Colts
Allan Rourke, Defence, Kitchener Rangers
Kevin Mitchell, Defence, Guelph Storm
Rob Zepp, Goaltender, Plymouth Whalers
Tom Webster, Coach, Windsor Spitfires

Third team
Josef Vasicek, Centre, Sault Ste. Marie Greyhounds
Johnathan Schill, Left Wing, Kingston Frontenacs
Denis Shvidki, Right Wing, Barrie Colts
Alexei Semenov, Defence, Sudbury Wolves
Mike Van Ryn, Defence, Sarnia Sting
Levente Szuper, Goaltender, Ottawa 67's
Stan Butler, Coach, Brampton Battalion

Awards

2000 OHL Priority Selection
On June 3, 2000, the OHL conducted the 2000 Ontario Hockey League Priority Selection at the Hershey Centre in Mississauga, Ontario. The Mississauga IceDogs held the first overall pick in the draft, and selected Patrick Jarrett from the Soo Thunderbirds. Jarrett was awarded the Jack Ferguson Award, awarded to the top pick in the draft.

Below are the players who were selected in the first round of the 2000 Ontario Hockey League Priority Selection.

See also
List of OHA Junior A standings
List of OHL seasons
2000 Memorial Cup
2000 NHL Entry Draft
1999 in sports
2000 in sports

References

HockeyDB

Ontario Hockey League seasons
OHL